Meant to Beh is a 2017 Philippine family comedy film directed by Chris Martinez and starred by Vic Sotto and Dawn Zulueta.

It was distributed and produced by OctoArts Films, M-Zet Productions and APT Entertainment and served as an official entry to the 2017 Metro Manila Film Festival. The movie also marks the reunion of Zulueta and Sotto after 20 years of working together in the fantasy series Okay Ka, Fairy Ko! way back in 1995.

Cast

Main cast

Vic Sotto as Ron Balatbat
Dawn Zulueta as Andrea Balatbat

Supporting cast
JC Santos as Christian Balatbat
Daniel Matsunaga as Benjo Marasigan
Sue Ramirez as Rihanna Biglang-awa
Gabbi Garcia as Alexandra Balatbat
Ruru Madrid as Diego Bartolome
Andrea Torres as Agatha Bayona
Baby Baste as Riley Balatbat

Special participation
Alden Richards as Cameo Role
Maine Mendoza
Kristine Hermosa-Sotto as young Andrea
Oyo Sotto as young Ron
Jose Manalo
Wally Bayola
Paolo Ballesteros
Kitkat
Roi Vinzon
Lharby Policarpio

Production

Development
On August 15, 2017, a story conference was held announcing the movie and Vic Sotto's return to the Metro Manila Film Festival (MMFF) after skipping it for a year after his movie Enteng Kabisote 10 and the Abangers didn’t make it to last year’s lineup.

In the conference, Sotto said that he definitely missed doing the MMFF and he was glad that they were back. He also agrees with the rules of this year's festival to accommodate everyone regarding the line-up of combining mainstream movies and indie films in the magic 8 movies. For Sotto, the dichotomy is unnecessary because all of them are promoting the Filipino movie industry.

It is also a first for him doing a family movie genre far from his past movies which is concentrated on fantasy and action. Several artists from two rival networks ABS-CBN and GMA Network agreed to be part of the movie.

The film's former title was Love Traps: #FamilyGoals during the announcement of first four movies included in the MMFF 2017. On the day of story conference, it was revealed that the movie title was changed to Meant to Beh. Also with the director from Tony Y. Reyes to be replaced by Chris Martinez.

Filming
Principal photography for the film began in August 2017.

Release
Meant to Beh premiered in Philippine cinemas on December 25, 2017 as one of the eight official entries of the 2017 Metro Manila Film Festival.

Reception

Box office
This is the first time that a Vic Sotto film didn't make it to the top 4 box office films.

Critical response
The film received mixed to positive reviews from critics after its premiere. Matt Suzara of Lakwatsera Lovers commented that "Meant To Beh is a good film to watch with your family this Christmas Day. Vic Sotto finally got lose from the Enteng series and came up with a decent family-friendly picture that is worthy of your hard-earned money." According to Ace Antipolo of Movies For Millennials, compared to the past Vic Sotto movies that came before, the film was "an improvement over his past movies." Baby Baste's performance was also praised. He was "the biggest stand-out of the film... He is oozing with charm and confidence on screen and he definitely stole the show." The reviewer concluded that "Meant To Beh is an entertaining, family-friendly comedy that is too good to miss."

References

External links
 

2017 films
Films shot in the Philippines
Filipino-language films
Philippine comedy films
OctoArts Films films
Films directed by Chris Martinez